The canton of Montluel is a former administrative division in eastern France. It was disbanded following the French canton reorganisation which came into effect in March 2015. It had 23,713 inhabitants (2012).

The canton comprised 9 communes:

Balan
Béligneux
La Boisse
Bressolles
Dagneux
Montluel
Niévroz
Pizay
Sainte-Croix

Demographics

See also
Cantons of the Ain department

References

Former cantons of Ain
Canton_of_Montluel
2015 disestablishments in France
States and territories disestablished in 2015